Azizbek Abdugofurov (born 6 March 1992) is an Uzbekistani professional boxer who held the WBC Silver super-middleweight title from 2018 to March 2021. As an amateur, Abdugofurov represented Uzbekistan at the 2013 AIBA World Boxing Championships.

Amateur career
Even though he was favoured to win the 2013 AIBA World Boxing Championships, he only was able to reach the quarter finals due to receiving a major cut against Artem Chebotarev. During the tournament, Abdugofurov defeated Aleksandar Drenovak.

Professional boxing titles
World Boxing Council
Asian Boxing Council middleweight title

Professional boxing record

References

External links
 

Uzbekistani male boxers
Living people
1992 births
Universiade medalists in boxing
Universiade silver medalists for Uzbekistan
Middleweight boxers
Medalists at the 2013 Summer Universiade
21st-century Uzbekistani people